Nyasha Michael Dube (born 14 December 1997) is a Zimbabwean footballer who plays as a midfielder for [Little Rock Rangers]. Nyasha was born in the town of Hwange in Zimbabwe. He started playing for Hwange FC under 14 in 2010 and he later got promoted to the Under 17 team until 2015. He then signed with the Under 20 team that played in the ZIFA Southern Region Division 1. After rejecting a first team contract with Hwange, he moved to the United States Of America on a football scholarship. Nyasha attended a tryout and out of about 150 players that attended the trials, he was the only chosen. After spending a year at Northeastern University, he moved to Central Baptist College where he obtained his bachelor's degree in business. Upon leaving Rangers at the end of the 2021 season, he signed with ambitious NPSL side Arkansas Wolves for the 2022/23 season.

Career

In 2017, Dube joined the Northeastern State RiverHawks in the United States. In 2019, he signed for American side Little Rock Rangers.

References

External links
 

1997 births
Association football midfielders
Expatriate soccer players in the United States
Living people
USL League Two players
Zimbabwean expatriate footballers
Zimbabwean expatriate sportspeople in the United States
Zimbabwean footballers
Zimbabwe international footballers